The War Memorial Shelters are two Grade II listed commemorative shelters in Kensington Gardens, London, about 100m apart, and about 140m east of Kensington Palace, built in about 1919 by the Silver Thimble Fund, to commemorate the Great War, and the soldiers and sailors who fought.

The seating inside them was removed in 2013, and they were listed in 2014.

References

External links

1919 in London
Buildings and structures completed in 1919
Grade II listed buildings in the City of Westminster
Grade II listed monuments and memorials
Kensington Gardens
World War I memorials in England